Mistaria jaundea, synonym Agelena jaundea, is a species of spider in the family Agelenidae, which contains at least 1,350 species . It was first described by Roewer in 1955 as Agelena jaundea. It is native to Cameroon.

References

Endemic fauna of Cameroon
Agelenidae
Spiders of Africa
Spiders described in 1955